was a Japanese entomologist. He authored numerous texts and was one of the founders of entomology in Japan, responsible for training a generation of Japanese entomologists, and founding the journal Zephyrus. He published numerous papers on the insects of Micronesia and was especially interested in aquatic insects and erected the family Helotrephidae along with W.E. China.

Esaki was born in Tokyo and grew up in Osaka. He went to Seventh Higher School Zoshikan (now Kagoshima University) and went to Tokyo Imperial University (now University of Tokyo) in 1920 and received a Ph.D. in 1930. He worked extensively on the heteroptera and focused on the Micronesian region. From 1923 he taught at the College of Agriculture, Kyushu Imperial University, Fukuoka. He left the next year and lived in Europe for about four and half years during which time he learned to speak German, Hungarian, Italian, French and Esperanto. He worked with G. Horvath on hemiptera at Budapest; in 1926, he worked at the Zoological Museum of Academy of Sciences of USSR in Leningrad. He married Charlotte Johanna Hermine Witte in Germany in 1928. They moved back to Japan in 1929 and he became a professor of entomology in 1930 at Kyushu University. His major contribution to entomology was the series Insects of Micronesia. He also founded the Japanese journal Zephyrus.

References

Further reading 
 
 
 
 
 

Japanese entomologists
Academic staff of Kyushu University
University of Tokyo alumni
Kagoshima University alumni
People from Osaka
1899 births
1957 deaths
20th-century Japanese zoologists